Lillix was a pop rock band from Cranbrook, British Columbia, Canada, formed in 1997 when the early members were in high school. The band was originally an all-girl group under the name Tigerlily composed of guitarist Tasha-Ray Evin, keyboardist Lacey-Lee Evin, bassist Louise Burns, and drummer Sierra Hills. In 2001 the band was signed by Maverick Records and changed their name to Lillix as there was another band called Tigerlily. Hills left in 2002 and was replaced by Kim Urhahn, and later by Alicia Warrington, a future WWE NXT ring announcer under the name Alicia Taylor. Urhahn has been among a rare group of left-handed female drummers. The band was considered on hiatus from late 2006 through 2009 due to the folding of their label, Maverick Records, and officially disbanded after the release of their independent third album in 2010. Their debut album Falling Uphill was an international success, selling more than half a million copies worldwide.

Career

2001–06: Falling Uphill and Inside the Hollow 

Under their original name of Tigerlily, the group sent their demo to an industry lawyer named Jonathan Simkin, who liked the band's sound and helped promote them to record labels. The group ultimately ended up signing with Maverick Records in 2001 and changed their name to Lillix. Their debut album Falling Uphill was released in Canada and the United States on 27 May 2003 and in Japan on 27 August. "It's About Time" was released as the band's first single in the spring of 2003 and reached 33 on the Billboard Mainstream Top 40 airplay chart. It was followed that fall by "Tomorrow", which did not enter the Billboard pop chart but did reach number 48 on the Radio & Records CHR/Pop Top 50 chart tracking airplay on contemporary hit radio stations. Falling Uphill also featured a cover of "What I Like About You" by The Romantics, which was featured on the 2003 Freaky Friday soundtrack, and serves as the theme song for the comedy series of the same name. The band received two nominations at the 2004 Junos. The album has sold more than half a million copies worldwide making it their best selling album.

The second album, Inside the Hollow, was released in Canada on 29 August 2006 and in Japan on 6 September. The only single from this album is "Sweet Temptation (Hollow)". This album's release featured drummer Alicia Warrington in October 2005.

2007–10: Hiatus, Tigerlily, and disbandment 
Maverick Records folded in 2007 as part of restructuring after becoming a wholly owned subsidiary of the Warner Music Group the previous year, and Lillix was not picked back up by Warner Bros. Records, leaving them without a record label. In April 2008, Lillix moved to Vancouver and was preparing to record a new album. On 15 March 2009, the band introduced a new member, Britt Black, and announced the recording of a new single, "Dance Alone". The song was released on 14 June. It was followed in March 2010 by "Nowhere to Run" and was later accompanied by a music video directed by Colin Minihan that premiered on 7 August. The title of the new album was announced on 17 July, to be Tigerlily in honour of their original band name.

Tigerlily was released in Canada on 24 August and later released in Japan along with two bonus tracks. The first single released was "Dance Alone", which did not chart but achieved moderate airplay. The album was met by positive reviews; music journalists such as Kate MacRae from ChartAttack have stated that "Tigerlily has some pretty good tracks ("7 Days", "Back Up Girl" and "Nowhere to Run"), Lillix". In November 2015, an interview with Lacey-Lee was published by SonicBids Blog discussing the band's label (Maverick) folding and the struggles they faced afterwards.

Discography

Studio albums

Singles

References

External links

 
Lillix, topic on YouTube
Lillix biography on AllMusic

All-female punk bands
Musical groups established in 1997
1997 establishments in British Columbia
Canadian girl groups
Musical groups from British Columbia
Maverick Records artists
Cranbrook, British Columbia
Canadian indie pop groups
Canadian pop rock music groups
Canadian alternative rock groups